is the 14th compilation album by Japanese entertainer Miho Nakayama. Released through King Records on February 1, 2006, the album compiles her singles from 1995 to 1999.

The album failed to crack the top 300 on Oricon's albums chart.

Track listing

References

External links
 
 

2006 compilation albums
Miho Nakayama compilation albums
Japanese-language compilation albums
King Records (Japan) compilation albums